Wanted: Original Motion Picture Soundtrack is a soundtrack to the 2008 film of the same name, released by Lakeshore Records and composed by Danny Elfman. It was released on June 24, 2008 in the United States and Canada.

Background 
Danny Elfman was invited to do the Wanted score, and accepted because he was a fan of director Timur Bekmambetov's previous films, Night Watch and Day Watch. Considering the film to be a "weird, twisted, sarcastic thing," Elfman decided to make a guitar-based soundtrack, with the "nastiest sounds" and a "heavy metal approach."

The main song that features throughout the film and as the credits roll is a rock song written and performed by Elfman called "The Little Things". Initially, it was just a guitar riff, to which the producers first asked Elfman to add a beat, and then some lyrics. Then, while Elfman was in London scoring Hellboy II: The Golden Army, he received a call from Bekmambetov, asking him to make a full version of the song. "The Little Things" also received a version in Russian.

Also featured twice in the film is the song "Every Day Is Exactly the Same" by Nine Inch Nails. Played for comic relief after the initial car chase is the song "Escape (The Pina Colada Song)" by Rupert Holmes, and "Time to Say Goodbye" by Andrea Bocelli plays while Fox and Wesley kill a man in a limousine.

Track listing

Release

Critical response 

William Ruhlmann of Allmusic gave the score a positive review, stating:

Christopher Coleman of Tracksounds.com gave the soundtrack 7 out of 10 rating, stating, "Danny Elfman weaves, what seems to be, nearly a dozen different motifs and other slightly less descript musical segments together to give Wanted its density." Sue Klasky of Monsters and Critics gave the soundtrack a mixed review, stating that "the music is dark, scary and ominous and performed on lots of violins." And that "Elfman's score sounds like it conveys the action in the film."

Zach Freeman of the Blogger News Network gave the soundtrack a positive review and a B+ rating, stating, "Elfman is one of the best composers working today, and though this isn't his best work, it's still darn good."

Chart positions

References

External links 
 
 Wanted: Original Motion Picture Soundtrack at the Amazon.com

2008 soundtrack albums
Action film soundtracks
Film scores
Thriller film soundtracks